The Nassereddin Shah relief known as Shekl Shah and Shekl-e Shah is a rock relief commissioned by Naser al-Din Shah Qajar around 1879, showing the shah on horseback flanked by ten standing ministers. It is the latest in a tradition of large rock reliefs ordered by Iranian rulers.  It is located on the Haraz road overlooking the Haraz river about 60 km from Amol in Mazandaran Province, Iran.  It is close to an ancient Sassanid road. The work was ordered after the new road was built in 1879.

The relief is carved within a rectangular frame 8 m long and 4 m high. It carries an inscription in Persian poetic verses.
Russian soldiers used this relief for target practice during World War II.

See also
 Nassereddin Shah Qajar
 Larijan Hot Spring
 Tangeh Savashi

References
 Sotudeh, M. 1995 (1374 AH). From Astara to Astarabad, vol. 3, western Mazandaran works and monuments

External links

Buildings and structures in Mazandaran Province
Tourist attractions in Mazandaran Province
Rock reliefs in Iran
Mountain passes of Asia
Landforms of Iran
Tourist attractions in Amol
Qajar Iran
1870s establishments in Iran